Ammagnostidae is a family of trilobites in the suborder Agnostina, small, eyeless, isopygous trilobites with a thorax consisting of 2 segments only. Four genera have been assigned to it:

Ammagnostus Öpik, 1967
Ammagnostus psammius Öpik, 1967 (Type)
Ammagnostus bassus (Öpik, 1967)
Ammagnostus bella Guo & Luo, 1996
Ammagnostus beltensis (Lochman, 1944)
Ammagnostus cryptus
Ammagnostus cylindratus Guo & Luo, 1996
Ammagnostus duibianensis Lu & Lin, 1989
Ammagnostus histus
Ammagnostus hunanensis
Ammagnostus integriceps Öpik, 1967
Ammagnostus laiwuensis (Lorenz, 1906)
Ammagnostus mitis Öpik, 1967
Ammagnostus sinensis Peng, 1987
Ammagnostus wangcunensis Peng & Robison
Hadragnostus Öpik, 1967
Hadragnostus las Öpik, 1967 (Type)
Hadragnostus edax Fortey & Rushton, 1976
Hadragnostus helixensis Jago & Cooper, 2005
Hadragnostus modestus (Lochman, 1944)
Kormagnostus Resser, 1938
Kormagnostus simplex Resser, 1938 (Type)
Kormagnostus boltoni Westrop et al., 1996
Kormagnostus copelandi Westrop et al., 1996
Kormagnostus flati Pratt, 1992
Kormagnostus inventus Shergold, 1982
Kormagnostus minutus (Schrank, 1975)
Kormagnostus seclusus (Walcott, 1884)
Proagnostus Butts, 1926
Proagnostus bulbus Butts, 1926 (Type)
Proagnostus centerensis Resser, 1938
Proagnostus maryvillensis Resser

They lived during the late Cambrian period to the Ordovician period.

References 
 https://www.biolib.cz/en/taxon/id456979/
 http://www.trilobites.info/ordagnostida.htm

Trilobite families
Agnostoidea
Cambrian trilobites
Ordovician trilobites
Cambrian first appearances
Ordovician extinctions